Dún Laoghaire Institute of Art, Design and Technology, more commonly known as IADT Dún Laoghaire or simply IADT is an institute of technology with a focus on art and design located in Deansgrange near Dún Laoghaire, Ireland. It was established in 1997 and incorporated the former Dún Laoghaire College of Art and Design as its School of Creative Arts.

Academic work

Approach
The institution has an emphasis on creative arts and media with the National Film School (NFS) located on campus. The college offers programmes in entrepreneurship, arts and humanities, business, arts management, psychology/cyberpsychology, computing and digital media technology.

Emphasis is placed on the convergence of the arts, technology and enterprise. A flagship campus incubation centre called Media Cube supports the graduate enterprise development programme and accommodates start-up business in the media and digital media sectors.

Organisation
IADT has two faculties:
Faculty of Film, Art and Creative Technologies
Faculty of Enterprise and Humanities.

Faculty of Film, Art and Creative Technologies
Courses include:
BSc (Honours) in Creative Media Technologies [replacing the BEng in Audio Visual Media Technology]
BSc (Honours) in Creative Computing [replacing the BSc in Computing in Multimedia Programming and BSc (Honours) in Computing Multimedia Systems/ Web Engineering]
BSc (Honours) in Applied Psychology 
BA (Honours) in Design in Model Making for Film and Media
BA (Honours) in Design for Stage and Screen
BA (Honours) in Animation 
BA (Honours) in Film & Television Production
BA (Honours) in Photography 
BA (Honours) in Design in Visual Communications 
BA (Honours) in Visual Arts Practice 
MSc in User Experience Design
MSc in Cyberpsychology
MA in Screenwriting 
MA in Visual Arts Practices 
MA in Broadcast Production for Radio and Television

National Film School
The National Film School is part of the Faculty of Film, Art and Creative Technologies. It was launched in 2003. It acts as a "centre of excellence" for film, animation, broadcasting and digital media. The School offers the only BA Honours in Film and Television Production in the country, although the Huston School in Galway, Galway-Mayo Institute of Technology and Ballyfermot College of Further Education in Dublin do offer diplomas in film-related studies.  

Notable visiting lecturers include Jim Sheridan, Oliver Stone, John Boorman, Neil Jordan, Stephen Frears, Stephen Rea and John Landis.

Faculty of Enterprise and Humanities
Formerly the School of Business and Humanities, the Faculty of Enterprise and Humanities focuses on the knowledge, media and entertainment sectors.

Courses include:
BA (Honours) in English, Media and Cultural Studies
BA (Honours) in Business Studies and Arts Management
Bachelor of Business (Honours) in Entrepreneurship & Management
Bachelor of Business in Entrepreneurship
Bachelor of Business (Honours) in Entrepreneurship
Postgraduate Diploma in Cultural Event Management
MA Public Culture Studies

Campus
The institute is located on Kill Avenue, about two kilometres west of Dún Laoghaire, close to Bakers Corner and Deansgrange. It is served by several bus routes. The former Dún Laoghaire College of Art and Design (now part of the Faculty of Film, Art and Creative Technologies at IADT) moved to the campus in the early 1980s. This move facilitated an expansion of facilities and led to the creation of IADT in 1997. The college had strong ties with artist Diarmuid Larkin and his son Seán, who later became its director.

The college has developed amenities such as the Media Cube for enterprise projects and SMEs in the technology sector and is expanding its campus to incorporate further departments and students. Sports facilities such as a full sized all weather floodlight soccer pitch have been added in recent years.

Campus history
The institute's site was a Christian Brothers home, Carriglea Park Industrial School, from 1894 to 1954. In the 2009 Report on child abuse, the Christian Brothers were found to be seen in a relatively favourable, if incompetent, light, in comparison to abuses in other industrial schools, and still play a key part in the Dún Laoghaire area, albeit entirely separate from the Dún Laoghaire campus.

Prior to being bought by the Christian Brothers, Carriglea was a  Georgian residence owned by the Goff Family.  The Reverend Robert Goff purchased the estate in 1826 for use as his principal residence.  The Reverend Goff died in 1844 and the estate passed to his wife and family.  Both the Reverend Robert Goff and his wife are interred in the church in Monkstown.  IADT has a collection of diaries written by the Reverend Goff from the late 18th Century until his death.

Facilities
Library
Computer labs
Outdoor AstroTurf pitches
Car parking (pay & display)
The chapel (Student Union area)
Canteen
Cafes: Costa Coffee, Starbucks Coffee

Student projects
Some student projects in IADT Dun Loaghaire have achieved acclaim such as a project by Gobias productions, a group of five students from IADT. The students developed a student film called, "On the cutting room floor." They went on to win all the judges categories in the student film competition at the Dare2Bdrinkaware awards ceremony. The award ceremony is for third level students in Ireland and is organised by the Digital Hub Development Agency (DHDA).

Clubs and societies
The college is also home to many clubs and societies including, the golf, soccer, enterprise and music society.

See also
Education in the Republic of Ireland
Third-level education in the Republic of Ireland

References

External links
Dún Laoghaire Institute of Art, Design and Technology official site
IADT's Student Union website
IADT's Centre for Creative Technologies and Applications (CCTA)
The Media Cube website
The FIS (Film in Schools) website

Dún Laoghaire Institute of Art, Design and Technology
Dún Laoghaire
Universities and colleges in the Republic of Ireland
Institutes of technology in the Republic of Ireland
Art schools in Ireland
Education in Dún Laoghaire–Rathdown